Christian Eduardo Giménez (born 1 February 1981) is a former professional footballer, commentator, and manager. Born in Argentina, he represented the Mexico national team. He is known by his nickname Chaco because he hails from the province of the same name.

Club career

Argentina
From a very early age, Giménez was playing football in a competitive environment. In 1989, he was signed by scouts working for Boca Juniors and was immediately enrolled in the team's youth squad. Almost a decade later, Giménez debuted in the professional Argentine league with Boca Juniors and quickly enjoyed success, being part of the teams that won the Apertura '98, Clausura '99 and Apertura 2002 championships for the Xeneizes, as well as two international titles, the Copa Libertadores of 2000 and 2001.

In 2003, Giménez split time at Independiente and Unión and later returned to Independiente for the first half of the 2004 season. Then Giménez migrated to Mexico, as he was transferred to Veracruz.

Mexico
At Veracruz, Giménez was joined by a talented squad that included Walter Jiménez, Cuauhtémoc Blanco, Kléber Boas, Braulio Luna and Gustavo Biscayzacú. In Giménez's first season at Veracruz, the team led the entire league in points, with Giménez scoring four goals throughout the regular season. Despite being the top-seeded team, Veracruz exited the playoffs in the first round. The following season, Veracruz lost Blanco and Boas in the transfer window, and new signing Leandro Romagnoli was not performing at top level despite his seven figure salary. As a result, the team's performance dropped and Veracruz missed the playoffs. Giménez also saw a drop in production at a personal level, failing to score a goal despite increased play.

Before the Apertura 2005 season, it was reported that Giménez's old teammate, Cuauhtémoc Blanco, was trying to convince América to sign Giménez for the following season. The executives took Blanco's advice and Giménez was signed to a contract shortly after. In his first season at América, Giménez scored three goals despite limited play (coming off the bench in eight of his nine appearances) and América led the league in points at the end of the regular season. Strangely enough, the set of events that occurred during Blanco and Giménez's (and Kléber Boas, who also migrated to América with Blanco in 2004) partnership in Veracruz repeated themselves at América. Like at Veracruz, their team was the top-seeded club going into the playoffs, and like at Veracruz, América failed to get past the first round of the playoffs, being defeated by Tigres UANL.

Prior to the start of the Apertura 2006 season, Giménez was transferred to Pachuca, who days before had won the Clausura 2006 tournament, defeating Club San Luis – a sister club of Christian's last employer, Club América. 2007 started promisingly to Giménez, scoring 8 goals in three matches.

Giménez is a member of the "Blanco Four", a group of players who once played at Veracruz with Blanco and were signed by América after being recommended by the striker. The other members are Kléber Boas, Carlos Infante and Armando Navarrete.

He left Pachuca on December 17, 2009 and signed for Cruz Azul. In the tornement Bicentario 2010 Gimenez was a quik starter for the team Cruz Azul, because of the coach Enrique Meza already knowing the great skills that Gimenez had from the years that Meza coached with Pachuca. Although Gimenez was one of the most important transfers of the season, he was not able to lead Cruz Azul to qualify for the quarter finals, and was only able to score two goals in 16 appearances. In the Apertura 2010 season, Giménez was criticized by the media because of his bad performance in the first season, and was wanted to be kicked out of Cruz Azul. But on the fifth matchday of the season Giménez scored his first hat-trick with Cruz Azul in a 3–2 win over Chiapas.

In 2018, Giménez returned to Pachuca on loan from Cruz Azul.

International career

Argentina
Giménez represented Argentina at the 2001 South American Youth Championship. Argentina finished the competition in second place but he was able to score two goals.

In 2009 Diego Maradona called up Giménez for Argentina's World Cup qualifiers in June against Colombia and Ecuador, but he did not play in any of the two matches.

Mexico
In July 2013, Giménez became a naturalized Mexican citizen. On August 14, 2013, coach Jose Manuel de la Torre called up Giménez for the Mexico national football team for a friendly against Ivory Coast, which Mexico won 4–1. Giménez played in four games for Mexico as part of the 2014 FIFA World Cup qualifying campaign, three games, those against Costa Rica, Honduras and U.S.A. resulted in losses. The other was a 2–1 victory over Panama on October 11, 2013.

On October 30, the national football association of Panama requested that FIFA re-evaluate whether the player was eligible for Mexico.

Giménez maintains that he is eligible for Mexico and that his appearances were non-binding for Argentina as Argentina had already qualified for the 2001 FIFA World Youth Championship as the host nation when he was playing for Argentina in CONMEBOL's 2001 South American Youth Championship. Giménez said that Argentina were considered to be a guest in the 2001 South American Youth Championship.

Style of play
Labeled an attacking midfielder, Giménez is one of many talented players to be exported from Boca Juniors. He is known for his strong shot and "vision to exploit the whole pitch with his range of passing."

Managerial career
On 30 June 2020, Giménez was named as the first manager of Liga de Expansión MX club Cancún FC.

Honours
Boca Juniors
Argentine Primera División: Apertura 1998,  Clausura 1999, Apertura 2000
Copa Libertadores: 2000, 2001

América
CONCACAF Champions' Cup: 2006

Pachuca
Mexican Primera División: Clausura 2007
CONCACAF Champions' Cup: 2007, 2008
Copa Sudamericana: 2006

Cruz Azul
Copa MX: Apertura 2013
CONCACAF Champions League: 2013–14

Individual
Mexican Primera División Golden Ball: Clausura 2009
Mexican Primera División Best Attacking Midfielder: Clausura 2009, Apertura 2010

Personal life
He is the father of Feyenoord player Santiago Giménez.

References

External links
 
 
 
  

1981 births
Living people
People from Resistencia, Chaco
Sportspeople from Chaco Province
Argentine footballers
Association football wingers
Boca Juniors footballers
Unión de Santa Fe footballers
Club Atlético Independiente footballers
Argentine Primera División players
Argentina youth international footballers
Argentine emigrants to Mexico
Naturalized citizens of Mexico
Mexican footballers
Club América footballers
C.D. Veracruz footballers
C.F. Pachuca players
Cruz Azul footballers
Liga MX players
Mexico international footballers
Mexican people of Argentine descent
Sportspeople of Argentine descent